The 2020 Triglav osiguranje Radivoj Korać Cup was the 18th season of the Serbian men's national basketball cup tournament. The tournament was held in Niš between 13–16 February 2020.

Partizan NIS successfully defended their title, winning third time in a row.

Qualified teams

1 League table position after 13 rounds played

Venue

Draw 
The draw was held in the Crowne Plaza hotel in Belgrade on 30 January 2019.

Bracket

Quarterfinals
All times are local UTC+1.

Crvena zvezda mts v Radnički Beograd

Mega Bemax v Sloboda

FMP v Dynamic VIP PAY

Partizan NIS v Borac

Semifinals 
All times are local UTC+1.

Mega Bemax v Crvena zvezda mts

Partizan NIS v FMP

Final

This is the fourth final game in a row between Crvena zvezda and Partizan, and the seventh final in the Radivoj Korać Cup overall.

See also
2019 ABA League Supercup
2019–20 Milan Ciga Vasojević Cup

References

External links
 Official website  
 Competitions in Basketball Federation of Serbia 

Radivoj Korać Cup
Radivoj
Serbia